Tentax mini is a moth of the family Erebidae first described by Michael Fibiger in 2011. It is found in Sri Lanka (it was described from the Ampara and Matale districts).

The wingspan is 7–7.5 mm. The forewings are whitish grey, suffused with a few light-brown patches. The colour is black brown at the quadrangular upper medial area. The costa is basally black, subapically with small black dots. The fringes are whitish grey. The crosslines are untraceable, except the terminal line, which is indicated by black interveinal dots. The hindwings are grey. The underside of the forewings is unicolorous light brown and the underside of the hindwings is grey with an indistinct discal spot.

References

Micronoctuini
Taxa named by Michael Fibiger
Moths described in 2011